Drongen (French: Tronchiennes) is a district within the city of Ghent (Arrondissement of Ghent).

Drongen is divided into three parishes: Drongen, Luchteren and Baarle.

Monastery
Drongen is known for its early medieval monastery, Drongen Abbey, founded in the 7th century by the monk Amandus, the Missionary of the Leie and Schelde. Destroyed by the Normans in 853, the monastery was rebuilt by the counts of Flanders. The monastery was the victim of the religious wars following the Reformation, and in 1578 it was once again destroyed by Calvinists.

In 1638, the abbey church was rebuilt and between 1638 and 1698 the monastery was restored. After a fire in 1727, the church tower was restored once again in 1734, with a distinctive appearance. In 1797, the French occupied and sold the abbey. In 1804, Lieven Bauwens used the monastery as a textile plant. The current monastery and abbey church date from 1859 and remain in use as a spiritual centre run by the Society of Jesus dedicated to the teachings of Ignatius of Loyola.

Notable people
Drongen is the birthplace of professional footballer Kevin De Bruyne.

Gallery

External links 

  Oude Abdij ('Old Abbey') 
  Heemkundige Kring Dronghine ('Local History Circle Dronghine')  
  Practical information about Drongen

Sub-municipalities of Ghent
Populated places in East Flanders